Yuri Presekin (born 29 October 1961) is a Russian swimmer. He competed in the men's 4 × 200 metre freestyle relay at the 1980 Summer Olympics.

References

External links
 

1961 births
Living people
Russian male swimmers
Olympic swimmers of the Soviet Union
Swimmers at the 1980 Summer Olympics
Sportspeople from Lipetsk
Soviet male swimmers
Russian male freestyle swimmers
Universiade medalists in swimming
Universiade silver medalists for the Soviet Union
Medalists at the 1981 Summer Universiade